Rabeya Khan is a Bangladeshi cricketer who plays as a right-arm leg break bowler.

In November 2019, she earned her maiden call-up to the Bangladesh women's cricket team, for the 2019 Women's South Asian Games, which took place in Nepal. She made her Women's Twenty20 International (WT20I) debut for Bangladesh, against Nepal, on 4 December 2019. She took four wickets for eight runs in the match and was named the player of the match. This was also the fourth best bowling figures on debut and the fifth best bowling figure by a Bangladeshi bowler in a Women's T20I.

In January 2020, she was named as a standby player in the Bangladesh's squad for the 2020 ICC Women's T20 World Cup. In March 2021, she was named in the Bangladesh Women's Emerging team's squad for their home series against South Africa Emerging. In the third match of the series, she took three wickets while conceding 15 runs and was named the player of the match. She was selected to play for the Blue Team in the 2020–21 Bangabandhu 9th Bangladesh Games.

References

External links
 
 

Living people
Date of birth missing (living people)
Year of birth missing (living people)
Place of birth missing (living people)
Bangladeshi women cricketers
Bangladesh women Twenty20 International cricketers
Southern Zone women cricketers
South Asian Games medalists in cricket
South Asian Games gold medalists for Bangladesh